Dominion Towers is an office complex in Denver, Colorado. It consists of two adjoining towers, and was built in 1982. The buildings have pink granite facades and blue-tinted windows.

See also
List of tallest buildings in Denver

References
Denver Skyscrapers
Skyscraperpage

Skyscraper office buildings in Denver
Twin towers
1982 establishments in Colorado
Office buildings completed in 1982